Parhoplophryne is a monotypic frog genus in the family Microhylidae. The sole species is Parhoplophryne usambarica, sometimes known as the Usambara black-banded frog or Amani forest frog. It is endemic to the East Usambara Mountains in Tanzania. It is only known from one specimen collected in the 1920s and is feared to be extinct.

Description
This species is only known from the holotype, a juvenile female that measured  in snout–vent length. In addition, a series of tadpoles was also collected, but it is uncertain whether they belong to this species or Hoplophryne rogersi.

The holotype had moderately stout general appearance, with a small head, acuminate snout, and small mouth. No tympanum is present. The fingers and toes were without any webbing. The skin was perfectly smooth (i.e., without any spinosities) but with rugose folds. Colouration was very similar to Hoplophryne rogersi, which is slatey-blue above, shading to blue-grey peripherally. A white band was running from eye to base of fore limb. The underside was white, blotched and spotted with dark brown.

Habitat and conservation
Other information on the species' habitat and ecology is not available.

Considering that many surveys undertaken in the area, without positive records, and the extent of habitat loss in the area (first by tea plantations and at present by small scale agriculture), it is possible that this species is extinct. Theoretically, it might be present in the Amani Nature Reserve, although intensive sampling has not revealed any specimens.

References

Microhylidae
Monotypic amphibian genera
Frogs of Africa
Amphibians of Tanzania
Endemic fauna of Tanzania
Amphibians described in 1928
Taxa named by Thomas Barbour
Taxa named by Arthur Loveridge
Taxonomy articles created by Polbot